Ryan Tobler (born May 13, 1976) is a Canadian former professional ice hockey winger who played four games in the National Hockey League (NHL) with the Tampa Bay Lightning during the 2001–02 season, going scoreless. He retired after the 2009-10 season after spending 7 years with the Colorado Eagles, with his number retired by the club on March 27, 2015. He currently serves as an assistant coach to the Colorado Eagles.

Career statistics

References

External links

1976 births
Adirondack Red Wings players
Calgary Hitmen players
Calgary Royals players
Canadian expatriate ice hockey players in the United States
Canadian ice hockey forwards
Chicago Wolves players
Colorado Eagles players
Hartford Wolf Pack players
Lake Charles Ice Pirates players
Living people
Milwaukee Admirals (IHL) players
Moose Jaw Warriors players
Saskatoon Blades players
Ice hockey people from Calgary
Springfield Falcons players
Swift Current Broncos players
Tampa Bay Lightning players
Undrafted National Hockey League players
Utah Grizzlies (IHL) players
Wilkes-Barre/Scranton Penguins players